The 2012 Asian Boxing Olympic Qualification Tournament was held in Astana, Kazakhstan from April 5 to April 12.

Qualified athletes

Qualification summary

Results

Light flyweight

Flyweight

Bantamweight

Lightweight

Light welterweight

Welterweight

Middleweight

Light heavyweight

Heavyweight

Super heavyweight

See also
 Boxing at the 2012 Summer Olympics – Qualification

References

 Men's Light Fly 46-49kg
 Men's Fly 52kg
 Men's Bantam 56kg
 Men's Light 60kg
 Men's Light Welter 64kg
 Men's Welter 69kg
 Men's Middle 75kg
 Men's Light Heavy 81kg
 Men's Heavy 91kg
 Men's Super Heavy +91kg

External links
 AIBA

Olympic Qualification
Boxing Olympic Qual
Boxing Olympic Qual